Harding County is the name of two counties in the United States:

 Harding County, New Mexico
 Harding County, South Dakota